Piacenza is a city in Italy.

Piacenza may also refer to:

Places

Italy
 Province of Piacenza, a province 
 Piacenza d'Adige, a town

United States
 Piacenza, Wisconsin, an unincorporated community

People
 Mauro Piacenza, a prelate
 Domenico da Piacenza, dancing master
 Aymeric of Piacenza, Dominican scholar
 Saint Antoninus of Piacenza
 Antoninus of Piacenza (pilgrim)
 Mario Piacenza, explorer
 Ardoino da Piacenza, cardinal
 Conrad of Piacenza, nobleman

Sports clubs
 Piacenza Calcio, a football club
 Pallavolo Piacenza, a volleyball team

Historical events
 Battle of Piacenza
 Council of Piacenza

Military units
 103 Motorised Division Piacenza an infantry division of Italy of World War II

Artifacts
 Liver of Piacenza

See also
 Castelvetro Piacentino
 Carpaneto Piacentino
 San Giorgio Piacentino
 Ziano Piacentino
 Placentia (disambiguation)

Italian-language surnames